Protepicorsia is a genus of moths of the family Crambidae.

Species
Protepicorsia agraptalis (Dognin, 1903)
Protepicorsia albipennis (Dognin, 1903)
Protepicorsia bicolor Munroe, 1964
Protepicorsia costalis (Dognin, 1903)
Protepicorsia ectoxanthia (Hampson, 1899)
Protepicorsia flavidalis (Hampson, 1913)
Protepicorsia latimarginalis Munroe, 1964
Protepicorsia maculifera Munroe, 1964
Protepicorsia magnifovealis (Hampson, 1918)
Protepicorsia pozuzoa Munroe, 1964
Protepicorsia quincemila Munroe, 1978
Protepicorsia sordida Munroe, 1978
Protepicorsia thyriphora (Hampson, 1899)

References

Natural History Museum Lepidoptera genus database

Pyraustinae
Crambidae genera
Taxa named by Eugene G. Munroe